The sulphur-billed nuthatch (Sitta oenochlamys) is a species of bird in the family Sittidae. It is endemic to the Philippines. Its natural habitats are subtropical or tropical moist lowland forest and subtropical or tropical moist montane forest. It is commonly found in mixed flocks along with Blue-headed fantails, sunbirds, flowerpeckers and other small forest birds.

References

sulphur-billed nuthatch
Endemic birds of the Philippines
sulphur-billed nuthatch
Taxonomy articles created by Polbot